Tambura was a state in South Sudan. It was created in January 2017 and abolished on 22 February 2020.

References

States of South Sudan